The 1924 Constitution of the Soviet Union was the constitution of the Soviet Union adopted on 31 January 1924. According to British historian Archie Brown the constitution was never an accurate guide to political reality in the USSR. For example, the fact that the Communist Party played the leading role in making and enforcing policy was not explicitly mentioned in it until 1977.

History of the Constitution
The 1924 Constitution was the first constitution of the Soviet Union and ratified by the Second Congress of Soviets. The 1924 Constitution legitimized the December 1922 Treaty on the Creation of the USSR between the Russian Soviet Federative Socialist Republic, the Ukrainian Soviet Socialist Republic, the Byelorussian Soviet Republic, and the Transcaucasian Socialist Federative Soviet Republic founding the Soviet Union. In essence, the 1924 Constitution was an expansion and generalization of the 1922 Treaty, with most of the major parts already specified by the treaty, and also allowed for a potential expansion of the Soviet Union. Whereas the original Treaty had only 26 articles, the 1924 Constitution now had 72 divided into eleven chapters. The 1924 Constitution replaced the Russian Constitution of 1918 which served as a precursor and influenced the main principles of the Union-wide constitution.

The 1924 Constitution established the Congress of Soviets to be the supreme body of Soviet state authority, with the Central Executive Committee having this authority during the interims and serving as the country's collective presidency. The Central Executive Committee also elected the Council of People's Commissars, which served as the executive branch of the government. The Central Executive Committee was divided into the Soviet of the Union representing the constituent republics, and the Soviet of Nationalities representing directly the interests of nationality groups. The Presidium supervised the government administration between sessions of the Central Executive Committee.

The 1924 Constitution survived six editions until it was replaced by the 1936 Constitution of the Soviet Union on 5 December 1936.

See also
 1936 Soviet Constitution
 1977 Soviet Constitution

References

 - Soviet Union

External links
 Full Text and All Laws Amending the 1924 Constitution of the U.S.S.R.
 Constitution of the Union of Soviet Republics Abridged
 Constitution of the Union of Soviet Republics

Constitutions of the Soviet Union
Soviet Constitution
1924 in the Soviet Union
1924 documents
January 1924 events